"Stay (While the Night Is Young)" is a song written by Jimmy Manzie and recorded by Australian band Ol' 55. The song was released in November 1977 as the lead single from the band's third studio album, Cruisin' for a Bruisin' (1978). The song peaked at number 16 on the Australian Kent Music Report.

Track listing
 7" (K-6936)
Side A	"Stay (While the Night Is Young)" - 4:06
Side B "Caught in the Curl" - 2:14

Charts

References

1977 songs
1977 singles
Ol' 55 (band) songs
Songs written by Jimmy Manzie
Mushroom Records singles